"Shikva" (lit. Querulousness or Complain ) is a song by Pakistani recording artist Faakhir Mehmood from his fourth studio album Jee Chahay (2011). It was released in the Pakistan as a digital download in 2011 and revised addition in 2014. "Shikva" is a love-inspired balled that details the protagonist pleading with his lover to leave the drug addiction. The song was written by Prashant Vasal an Indian poet, while composed and produced by Fakhir himself and directed by Adnan Khandar.

In 2011 release, song wasn't a hit, but 2014 version by Faakhir tops the chart, making one of the most successful singles by singer. At 3rd Annual Hum Awards ceremony, it was nominated for Best Music Single for Faakhir and Best Music Video for Adnan Khandar.

About the song
Sikva was first released with album in 2011 with the total track length of 5:55, it was a half musical balled and half Qawali and did average with topping charts, besides album most hit Baylia. In 2014, Fakhir re-released the song as a music single with dynamic music video, which got critical acclaim and attention.

Composition
Fakhir has done the composition for both versions of song.

Music video
Video deals with the issue of Drug addiction in Pakistan, and the synopsis of video is truly based content.

Theme
Music video officially states the following message at the end of video:

Synopsis
Video deals with the elements of love, separation and nostalgia. Featuring super models Rizwan Ali Jaffri and Fouzia Aman as main protagonist. In which Female protagonist pleads to her love interest to leave the addiction, but he is unable to respond ending their relationship. He couldn't get over with their memories and he lends more into the addiction and finally while drunk lost in addiction of pain and lust he gets killed in a car accident.

Cast and Crew

 Lyricist: Prashant Vasl 
 Producer: Faakhir
 Director: Adnan Khandar
 Composer: Faakhir  
 Music: Shani and Kami
 Post: Haroon and Ghaffar
 Artist: Rizwan Ali Jaffri and Fouzia Aman

Track listing 

CD single
"Shikva" — 5:55

Digital download (2014 version)
"Shikva"  featuring Rizwan Ali Jaffri and Fouzia Aman  — 4:47

References

External links
 
 Shikva on Dailymotion
 Shikve on ARY Musik

2011 songs
2014 singles